WGS may refer to:

 World Geodetic System, a reference frame for the earth for use in geodesy and navigation
 Wideband Global SATCOM, a United States and Australian military communication satellite system
 Wisbech Grammar School, an independent school in Cambridgeshire, England
 Withington Girls' School, a girls' school in Fallowfield, Manchester, England
 Wolverhampton Grammar School, an independent school in Wolverhampton, England
 Whole genome sequencing, a laboratory process that determines the complete DNA sequence of an organism's genome at a single time
 Water gas shift reaction, a chemical reaction of carbon monoxide and water vapor into carbon dioxide and hydrogen
 World Gourmet Summit, a food festival
 Women's and Gender Studies, a field of study at universities worldwide